Abdoul Moustapha Kaboré (born 1 January 1996) is a Burkinabé professional footballer who plays as a forward for AS Muret.

Club career
In January 2019, he moved to Limoges. He then moved to Iris Club de Croix six months later, before joining Championnat National 3 club AS Muret in January 2020.

International career
Kaboré made his debut for the Burkina Faso national football team in a 3–0 friendly loss to Chile on 2 June 2017.

References

1996 births
Living people
People from Ouagadougou
Burkinabé footballers
Burkina Faso international footballers
Ligue 2 players
Championnat National players
Championnat National 2 players
Championnat National 3 players
FC Metz players
CS Sedan Ardennes players
Entente SSG players
Limoges FC players
Burkinabé expatriate footballers
Burkinabé expatriate sportspeople in France
Expatriate footballers in France
Association football forwards
Iris Club de Croix players
21st-century Burkinabé people